Ice cross downhill is a winter extreme sporting event which involves direct competitive downhill skating on a walled track featuring sharp turns and high vertical drops.  Ice cross downhill is similar to ski cross and boardercross, except with ice skates on an ice track, instead of using skis or snowboards on a snow track. 

Events were held under the name Red Bull Crashed Ice from 2001-2019, and have been sanctioned by the ATSX since 2019.

Course configurations and equipment

Courses

Contestants race down the course's turns, berms, and jumps. After racing one after another in the time trials, typically there are four racers starting each race.

Equipment

Racers wear helmets, ice hockey equipment, bandy equipment, ringette equipment, or in some cases equipment from other sports. Ice hockey skates and bandy skates are used. Ice hockey skates have a design whose blade is cut to create two working edges giving downhill skaters control and the ability to make sharp turns and stops. Bandy skates have flatter, longer blades and typically do not have a tendon guard, however they do not have the same turning ability that ice hockey skates do.

In 2015, Sadie Lundquist discussed the ice cross downhill equipment racers were using during an interview:

Contestants

Racers are typically ice hockey players, though ringette players, bandy players, speed skaters, and figure skaters have also competed.

America's seven-time single event winner Jasper Felder is particularly notable. Felder was a bandy player who represented the USA for the United States national bandy team, and while in ice cross dowhill, represented Sweden. Finland's  has also competed, a ringette player from Finland's national ringette team who also played in Canada's National Ringette League.

Gallery

See also 
 Tour skating
 Speed skating
 Short track speed skating
 Ice hockey
 Bandy
 Ringette
 Figure skating

References

External links 

 ATSX, the All Terrain Skate Cross Federation
 IICSF, the International Ice Cross Sports Federation
 Red Bull, Crashed Ice
 World Ice Cross League

Ice skating sports
Individual sports